The Killer 3s are an American men's 3-on-3 basketball team that plays in the BIG3.

All Draft Picks

2017 Draft

2018 Draft

2019 Draft

Current roster

References

Big3 teams
Basketball teams established in 2017
2017 establishments in the United States